Lewis Tappan (May 23, 1788 – June 21, 1873) was a New York abolitionist who worked to achieve freedom for the enslaved Africans aboard the Amistad. Tappan was also among the founders of the American Missionary Association in 1846, which began more than 100 anti-slavery Congregational churches throughout the Midwest, and after the American Civil War, founded numerous schools and colleges to aid in the education of freedmen.

Contacted by Connecticut abolitionists soon after the Amistad arrived in port, Tappan focused extensively on the captive Africans. He ensured the acquisition of high-quality lawyers for the captives, which led to their being set free after the case went to the United States Supreme Court. With his brother Arthur, Tappan not only gained legal help and acquittal for the Africans, but also managed to increase public support and fundraising. Finally, he organized the return trip home to Africa for surviving members of the group.

Background
Lewis Tappan was the brother of Senator Benjamin Tappan and abolitionist Arthur Tappan. His middle-class parents, Benjamin Tappan (1747–1831) and Sarah Homes Tappan (1748–1826), were strict Congregationalists. Once Lewis was old enough to work, he helped his father in a dry goods store. On his sixteenth birthday, he ventured into other areas of commerce, and ultimately started The Mercantile Agency in 1841 in New York City. The Mercantile Agency was the precursor to Dun & Bradstreet (D&B) and modern credit-reporting services. (D&B is still in existence today.)

Convinced by Arthur to read a biography of William Wilberforce, who led the cause for abolition in Great Britain, Tappan started his quest for abolition in the United States. He is well known for his work to free the Africans from the Spanish ship Amistad.

The birth of abolitionism
Despite his Congregationalist upbringing, Lewis Tappan became attracted to Unitarianism for intellectual and social reasons. William Ellery Channing, a Unitarian minister, became Tappan's pastor. As a peace advocate, Channing played an influential role in Tappan's decision to join the Massachusetts Peace Society. In 1827 his brother Arthur convinced him to return to a Trinitarian denomination. Tappan joined Arthur in the Congregational church. Lewis Tappan initially supported the American Colonization Society (ACS), which promoted sending freed blacks from the United States to Africa, based on the assumption that this was their homeland, regardless of where they were born.

Frustrated by the slow progress of the ACS, Tappan and a sizable nucleus of men, including his brother Arthur, Theodore Dwight Weld, Gerrit Smith, Amos A. Phelps, and James Gillespie Birney, left the ACS to join what was to become known as the "immediatist" camp, who wanted to end slavery in the United States (US). Weld gained considerable influence following the move of the Tappan brothers to this group. In December 1833, at Philadelphia, Lewis Tappan joined activists such as William Lloyd Garrison to form the American Anti-Slavery Society.

The departure of the Tappans from the ACS is partially explained by the death of an African whom they repatriated. Captured in Africa and enslaved in Mississippi, Abdul Rahman Ibrahima Sori was a Fulani prince. He would have had potentially lucrative trade contacts in Africa. Partly for business reasons, the Tappans focused on Ibrahim's repatriation, which was finally achieved.  Shortly after reaching his homeland, however, Ibrahim died in 1829. This ended the Tappans' hopes of easily establishing significant African trade.

The Tappan brothers were Congregationalists and uncompromising moralists; even within the abolitionist movement, other members found their views extreme. Lewis Tappan advocated intermarriage (at the time called "amalgamation") as the long-range solution to racial issues, as all people would eventually be mixed race. He dreamed of a "copper-skinned" America where race would not define any man, woman, or child. Tappan characterized the arrival of the Amistad and its Africans on American shores as a "providential occurrence" that might allow "the heart of the nation" to be "touched by the power of sympathy."

The Tappan brothers created chapters of the American Anti-Slavery Society (AAS) throughout New York state and in other sympathetic areas. Although Tappan was popular among many, opponents of abolition attacked his homes and churches by arson and vandalism.

Lewis began a nationwide mailing of abolitionist material, which resulted in violent outrage in the South and denunciation by Democratic politicians, who accused him of trying to divide the Union. In the North, the mailings generated widespread sympathy and financial support for the American Anti-Slavery Society. By 1840, however, the anti-slavery program had expanded and the movement splintered.

After 1840, church-oriented abolitionism became dominant. That year Tappan formed the American and Foreign Anti-Slavery Society in disagreement with the AAS. The latter allowed a woman, Abby Kelley, to be elected to serve on the AAS business committee. Because of his strict religious beliefs, Tappan opposed the participation of women in an official capacity in the public society.

Tappan founded the abolitionist Human Rights journal and a children's anti-slavery magazine, The Slave's Friend.

The manual labor movement in education

"In July, 1831, Lewis Tappan, Gale, and others founded the Society for Promoting Manual Labor in Literary Institutions ["literary institutions" being schools], and later in the same year persuaded Theodore Weld, a living, breathing, and eloquently-speaking exhibit of the results of manual-labor-with-study, to accept the general agency." Manual labor—most commonly agricultural, or in a print shop—was supposed to bring students the physical and moral (psychological) benefits of exercise, while providing a type of financial aid to needy students. At the recommendation of Weld, the Tappans supported the new Lane Theological Seminary in Cincinnati. When Weld led a mass exodus to Oberlin, it then received their support.

Amistad case
In 1841, the Amistad case went to trial.  Tappan attended each day of the trials and wrote daily accounts of the proceedings for The Emancipator, a New England abolitionist paper.  He was a frequent contributor.  Throughout the trials in New Haven, Connecticut, Tappan arranged for several Yale University students to tutor the imprisoned Africans in English.  The lessons included their learning to read New Testament scriptures and to sing  Christian hymns.  The Africans later drew from these skills to raise funds to return to Africa.

After achieving legal victory in the US Supreme Court, Tappan planned to use the Amistad Africans as the foundation for his dream to Christianize Africa. The village of Mo Tappan, site of a mission to the Mende people, in modern Sierra Leone, is named for him.

Civil War years
In 1846, Tappan was among the founders of the American Missionary Association (AMA), led by Congregational and Presbyterian ministers, both white and black.  It linked anti-slavery activists of the East with Ohio and other Midwestern activists.  In addition, it took over managing numerous disparate missions: an Oberlin, Ohio mission to the Red Lake-area Ojibwe, a mission to Jamaica, a Mende mission to the Amistad Africans, and a mission to escaped blacks living in Canada.  As the AMA grew in influence, it expanded its enterprises. Among these, it began 115 anti-slavery Congregational churches in Illinois, aided by anti-slavery ministers such as Owen Lovejoy there.

In 1858, Tappan was the Treasurer of the AMA. Under the leadership of President Lawrence Brainerd, Tappan, Foreign Corresponding Secretary Rev. George Whipple, and Home Missions Corresponding Secretary Rev. S. S. Jocelyn, the AMA opposed the long-established and powerful American Board of Commissioners for Foreign Missions and American Home Missionary Society because of what the AMA alleged was their complicity with slavery.  During and after the American Civil War, Tappan and his brother Arthur worked from New York with the AMA on behalf of freedmen in the South.  In postwar efforts, it led the founding of numerous schools and colleges for freedmen, the historically black colleges and universities (HBCU).

Unwilling to reduce his commitment to U.S. government action against slavery in the southern states, Tappan and other radical political abolitionists denounced the Democratic Party as essentially pro-slavery.  Though mistrustful of politicians, Tappan supported various antislavery parties that culminated in formation of the Republican Party.  In both 1860 and 1864, Tappan voted for Abraham Lincoln.

Tappan supported the Emancipation Proclamation but believed that additional liberties were necessary. He wrote to Charles Sumner: "When will the poor negro have his rights? Not, I believe, until he has a musket in one hand and a ballot in the other."

Philanthropy 
Recipients of aid from Lewis Tappan included:
 American and Foreign Anti-Slavery Society
 American Anti-Slavery Society
 American Colonization Society
 American Missionary Association
 Human Rights (journal)
 Lane Theological Seminary
 Oberlin College
 Oneida Institute
 Amistad defendants

Writings

See also 
 United States v. The Amistad, the United States Supreme Court case

References

Sources
 Blue, Frederick J. No Taint of Compromise. Baton Rouge: Louisiana State University Press, 2006.
 Ceplair, Larry. The Public Years of Sarah and Angelina Grimke. New York: Columbia University Press, 1989.
 Harrold, Stanley. Subversives. Baton Rouge: Louisiana State University Press, 2003.
 Wyatt-Brown, Bertram. Lewis Tappan and the Evangelical War Against Slavery, New York: Athenaeum, 1971.

External links
 PBS entry
 Origin of the Tappan name
 American National Biography Entry
 
 
 American Abolitionists and Antislavery Activists, comprehensive list of abolitionist and anti-slavery activists in the United States, including Lewis Tappan, and antislavery organizations. Website includes historic biographies and anti-slavery timelines, bibliographies, etc.

 
American abolitionists
American Congregationalists
1788 births
1873 deaths
Burials at Green-Wood Cemetery
People from Northampton, Massachusetts
New York (state) Republicans
La Amistad
Businesspeople from New York City
American manual labor schools
Congregationalist abolitionists
19th-century American businesspeople
19th-century American philanthropists
Underground Railroad in New York (state)